The President and Directors of Georgetown College is the governing body of Georgetown University in Washington, D.C. In contrast to the Board of Regents and the Board of Governors, which serve advancement and alumni affairs functions, respectively, as well as advisory roles to the President, the President and Directors of Georgetown College is the legal entity of the incorporated Georgetown University. The authority of the body is enumerated in the March 1, 1815 federal charter of Georgetown University passed by the Thirteenth United States Congress and signed by President James Madison. The corporate charter of the University was amended by "An Act to Incorporate Georgetown College in the District of Columbia" in 1844. The legal name of the University was clarified by Public Law 89-631 passed by the 89th Congress and signed by President Lyndon Johnson on October 4, 1966, which authorized the institution to operate under the style of "Georgetown University" and permitted the University to exercise the powers granted to nonprofit corporations under the "District of Columbia Nonprofit Corporation Act" of 1962.

, the Board of Directors comprises 39 members, including a Chair and Vice Chair, and the President of Georgetown University who serves ex officio as a member of the board of directors. The current chairman is William J. Doyle, the former CEO of PotashCorp, and the Vice Chair is Paul Tagliabue, the former Commissioner of the National Football League.

See also 
 President of Georgetown University
 History of Georgetown University
 List of Georgetown University alumni

References

External links 
 Board of Directors of Georgetown University
 Georgetown University charter

Georgetown University
Georgetown University